Kirk Merritt (born January 5, 1997) is an American football wide receiver for the New Orleans Saints of the National Football League (NFL). He played college football at Arkansas State.

Early life and high school
Merritt grew up in Destrehan, Louisiana and attended Destrehan High School. He gained a combined 1,058 rushing and receiving yards and scored 11 total touchdowns as a senior. Merritt was rated a four-star recruit and committed to play college football at Oregon over offers from Alabama, Auburn, and Texas A&M.

College career
Merritt began his collegiate career at the University of Oregon. He played in 12 games for the Ducks as a freshman and caught five passes for 61 yards and rushed three times for 13 yards. Merritt left the program after his freshman year.

Merritt later transferred to Texas A&M. Merritt sat out the 2016 season due to NCAA transfer rules. He was dismissed from the team in April 2017, after being charged for two separate cases of indecent exposure. Following his dismissal, Merritt transferred to East Mississippi Community College. He caught 52 passes for 628 yards and four touchdowns in his lone season with the Lions and committed to transfer to Arkansas State University for his final two years of eligibility.

Merritt became an immediate starter for the Red Wolves and was named first-team All-Sun Belt Conference after leading the conference with 83 receptions and 1,005 receiving yards while also catching seven touchdowns. He repeated as a first-team All-Sun Belt selection as a redshirt senior after finishing the season with 70 receptions for 806 yards and 12 touchdowns.

Professional career

Miami Dolphins
Merritt was signed by the Miami Dolphins as an undrafted free agent on April 25, 2020. He was waived on September 4, 2020, during final roster cuts, but was signed to the team's practice squad on September 6. He was elevated to the active roster on November 7 for the team's week 9 game against the Arizona Cardinals, and reverted to the practice squad after the game. He was placed on the practice squad/COVID-19 list by the team on December 15, 2020, and restored to the practice squad three days later. He was elevated to the active roster again on December 31 for the week 17 game against the Buffalo Bills, and reverted to the practice squad again following the game. He signed a reserve/future contract with the Dolphins on January 6, 2021.

On August 31, 2021, Merritt was waived by the Dolphins and re-signed to the practice squad the next day.

New Orleans Saints
On January 24, 2022, Merritt signed a reserve/future contract with the New Orleans Saints. He was waived on August 30, 2022 and signed to the practice squad the next day. He was promoted to the active roster on December 23.

References

External links
Oregon Ducks bio
Arkansas State Red Wolves bio
Miami Dolphins bio

1997 births
Living people
American football wide receivers
Destrehan High School alumni
Arkansas State Red Wolves football players
Players of American football from Louisiana
Miami Dolphins players
East Mississippi Lions football players
African-American players of American football
Oregon Ducks football players
People from Destrehan, Louisiana
21st-century African-American sportspeople
New Orleans Saints players